12 Gold Bars is a 1980 compilation album by English rockers Status Quo. It achieved number 3 in the UK charts and remained in the charts for 48 weeks.  This was longer than any other Quo album.

All the songs featured on the album were hit singles during the period 1972–1979.

It was followed up by 12 Gold Bars Vol. 2 in 1984.

Track listing
Note: on the UK cassette version of the album, sides one and two were reversed.
Note: the Australian & New Zealand version alternated "Paper Plane" and "Rain" with each other

Side one
 "Rockin' All Over the World" (John Fogerty) – 3:34
 "Down Down" (Francis Rossi/Bob Young) – 3:50
 "Caroline" (Rossi/Young) – 3:44
 "Paper Plane" (Rossi/Young) – 2:56
 "Break the Rules" (Rossi/Young/Rick Parfitt/Alan Lancaster/John Coghlan) – 3:40
 "Again and Again" (Parfitt/Andy Bown/Jackie Lynton) – 3:42

Side two
 "Mystery Song" (Parfitt/Young) – 3:59
 "Roll Over Lay Down" (Rossi/Young/Lancaster/Parfitt/Coghlan) – 5:43
 "Rain" (Parfitt) – 4:34
 "Wild Side of Life" (Arlie Carter/William Warren) – 3:16
 "Whatever You Want" (Parfitt/Bown) – 4:02
 "Living on an Island" (Parfitt/Young) – 3:47

Charts

Certifications

References

1980 compilation albums
Status Quo (band) compilation albums